Chrysopetalum is a genus of polychaete worms.

Genus description
Feet uniramose, furnished with only one tuft of setae. Headlobe with four or (?) two eyes, a tentacle, two antennae, and two palpi. The first segment of body provided with four cirri on
each side ; the succeeding segments with a cirrus on each side. Body nearly as broad as long. Branchiae placed on each seg- ment, on each side of body, disposed in a fan-shaped row of flat setae or paleae. Paleae broad and rather short.

Chrysopetalum elegans is a synonym for Bhawania goodei.

References

External links 

 

Phyllodocida
Polychaete genera